The Albanians in Spain are people of full or partial Albanian ancestry and heritage in Spain. They trace their ancestry to the territories with a large Albanian population in the Balkans among others to Albania, Greece, Kosovo as well as to Italy.

As of 2020, 3,753 Spanish residents stated they had Albanian ancestry. Approximately 45% of the Albanian population reside in the provinces of Barcelona and Madrid. Within both provinces, the majority of the Albanian population were predominantly concentrated in the metropolitan areas and agglomerations of Barcelona and Madrid.

Notable people 
 Juan Pedro Aladro Kastriota nobleman, diplomat and royalty 
 Iván Balliu football player

See also 

 Immigration to Spain
 Albanian diaspora
 Albania–Spain relations

References 

 

Albanian
 
Spanish
Muslim communities in Europe